is a 2005 Japanese drama film written and directed by  Takashi Yamazaki, based on the manga Sunset on Third Street by Ryōhei Saigan. It was chosen as Picture of the Year at the Japan Academy Film Prize in 2006.

The film spawned two sequels, Always: Sunset on Third Street 2 (2007) and Always: Sunset on Third Street '64 (2012).

Plot

In 1958, with the impending completion of Tokyo's TV broadcasting tower as a symbol of Japan's escalating post-war economic recovery, rural schoolgirl Mutsuko (Maki Horikita) arrives from the provinces to begin her first job with Suzuki Auto. Initially impressed by meeting company "president" Norifumi Suzuki (Shinichi Tsutsumi), Mutsuko is shocked to discover her workplace is actually a shabby auto repair shop in Tokyo's down-at-heel Yuhi district.

Suzuki is a bad-tempered employer but Mutsuko is welcomed by his wife, Tomoe (Hiroko Yakushimaru), and their impish 5-year-old son, Ippei (Kazuki Koshimizu). One of Ippei's favorite haunts is a five-and-dime store managed by struggling serial writer Ryunosuke Chagawa (Hidetaka Yoshioka). Regarding now-successful writers like Nobel-prize winner Kenzaburo Oe, as overrated, Chagawa wants to be more than a hack churning out sci-fi yarns and selling cheap toys on the side.

When alluring newcomer Hiromi (Koyuki) opens a sake bar in the area, she gathers clientele quickly—in dramatically compressed manga style—but also finds herself lumbered with Junnosuke (Kenta Suga) the orphaned offspring of the bar's previous tenant. Drunk, and smitten by Hiromi, Chagawa accepts custodianship of the boy.

Reception
The film ranked 15th at the Japanese box office in 2005, and won 12 prizes at the 2006 Japanese Academy Awards, including the awards for Best Film, Director, Actor and Screenplay. It also won the audience award at the 2006 New York Asian Film Festival.

Cast
 Maki Horikita as Mutsuko Hoshino, the apprentice
 Hidetaka Yoshioka as Ryunosuke Chagawa, the writer
 Shinichi Tsutsumi as Norifumi Suzuki, the mechanic
 Koyuki as Hiromi Ishizaki, sake bar owner
 Hiroko Yakushimaru as Tomoe Suzuki, the mechanic's wife
 Kazuki Koshimizu as Ippei Suzuki, the mechanic's son
 Kenta Suga as Junnosuke Furuyuki, the abandoned boy

References

External links

 
 
 
 

2005 drama films
2005 films
Films directed by Takashi Yamazaki
Films scored by Naoki Satō
Films set in Tokyo
Japanese drama films
2000s Japanese-language films
Live-action films based on manga
Picture of the Year Japan Academy Prize winners
Sunset on Third Street
Toho films
2000s Japanese films